Red Oak Township is one of seventeen townships in Cedar County, Iowa, USA.  As of the 2000 census, its population was 194.

History
The first cabin in Red Oak Township was built in 1836 by the Oaks family.

Geography
According to the USGS, it contains one cemetery, Red Oak.

References

External links
 US-Counties.com
 City-Data.com

Townships in Cedar County, Iowa
Townships in Iowa